East is an English surname. Notable people with the surname include:

Andrew East (born 1991), American football player
Angela East, British cellist
Bobby East (born 1984), American racing driver
Danny East (born 1991), English footballer
David East, British rugby union official
David East (artist), American artist
Edward Hyde East (1764–1847), British politician
Edward Murray East (1879–1938), American plant geneticist, botanist, and eugenicist
Elyssa East, American writer
Guy East (cyclist) (born 1987), American; brother of Andrew East
Ida Horton East (1842-1915), American philanthropist
Jamie East (born 1974), English television presenter
Jeff East (born 1957), American actor
John Porter East, US Senator
Katherine East, Canadian-British actress
Kevin East (born 1971), American soccer player
May East, Brazilian musician
Michael East (composer) (c. 1580–1648), English organist and composer
Michael East (athlete) (born 1978), English middle distance runner
Morris East (born 1973), Filipino boxer
Nathan East (born 1955), American musician
Paul East (born 1946), New Zealand politician
Ray East (born 1947), English cricketer
Robert East (actor) (born 1943), Welsh actor
Ron East (born 1943), American football player
Shawn Johnson East (born 1992), American gymnast; wife of Andrew East
Thomas East, English printer and music publisher
Warren East (born 1961), British businessman
William East (disambiguation)

English-language surnames